John Carvell Williams (20 September 1821 – 8 October 1907) was an English Nonconformist campaigner and a Liberal Party politician.

Williams was the son of John Allen Williams of Stepney and his wife Mary Carvell, and was educated privately. He was a Nonconformist and campaigned against the privileged status of the Church of England. From 1847 to 1877, he was secretary to the Liberation Society and was Parliamentary chairman to the society. He authored works on disestablishment and other ecclesiastical subjects. He was a Director of Whittlington Life Insurance Company.

In the 1885 general election, Williams was elected as the Member of Parliament (MP) for Nottingham South but lost the seat in the 1886 general election. He was elected MP for Mansfield In the 1892 general election and held the seat until the 1900 general election.

Williams married Anne Goodman, daughter of Ricard Goodman, of Hornsey. She died on 21 December 1902.

Williams lived at Crouch End and died at the age of 86.

Publications

A Plea for a Free Churchyard 1870
Religious Liberty in the Churchyard 1876
The Demand for Freedom in the Church of England
Disestablishment 1885

References

External links 

 

1821 births
1907 deaths
Liberal Party (UK) MPs for English constituencies
UK MPs 1885–1886
UK MPs 1892–1895
UK MPs 1895–1900